Labeobarbus microterolepis is a species of cyprinid fish in the genus Labeobarbus. It is endemic to Ethiopia. It may also be a hybrid of Labeobarbus ethiopicus and Labeobarbus intermedius.

References 

 

microterolepis
Cyprinid fish of Africa
Fish of Ethiopia
Endemic fauna of Ethiopia
Taxa named by George Albert Boulenger
Fish described in 1902